Arha may be,

Arha language
See List of characters in Earthsea#Tenar